Joseph d'Abbadie de Saint-Castin (fl. 1720–1746) was a French and Acadian military officer serving in Acadia. He was also an Abenaki chief. 

His father was Jean-Vincent d'Abbadie de Saint-Castin and Joseph's brother was Bernard-Anselme d'Abbadie de Saint-Castin. Joseph was the younger brother of Bernard-Anselme, who was born in 1689.  This suggests he was born in either 1690 or 1691.  Joseph took tribal councils as a Sachem, along with his brother.  When his brother went to France and never returned, Joseph remained with his Tarratine brethren, who were part of the Micmac Tribe that lived on the Penobscot. Differing from the Abenaki which would later become the Penobscot Indians.

Baron Joseph was the Grandson of the great Mi'kmaq Sachem Madockawando, he was Chief of the Tarratines on the Penobscot River.

Currently the Penebscot Tribal Nation claims Chief Joseph was a grandson of Baron St. Castin, which is easily proven wrong if one takes into account the age of Chief Joseph when he died at being 111 years old.

References 
 

1746 deaths
French soldiers
People from Hancock County, Maine
Acadian history
Year of birth unknown